Ayqer Chaman may refer to:
 Ayqer Chaman-e Olya
 Ayqer Chaman-e Sofla